Nils-Ole Foshaug (born 22 November 1970) is a Norwegian politician.

He was elected representative to the Storting from the constituency of Troms for the period 2021–2025, for the Labour Party. He was deputy representative to the Storting 2017–2021.

References

1970 births
Living people
Labour Party (Norway) politicians
Troms politicians
Members of the Storting